Cliff is a masculine given name. It is a short form of Clifford or Clifton. It may refer to:

People

Actors and directors
Cliff Arquette (1905–1974), American comedian and actor
Cliff Bole, American and Canadian television director
Cliff Curtis, New Zealand actor
Cliff De Young, American character actor
Cliff Parisi, British actor and EastEnders star
Cliff Robertson (1923–2011), American actor

In music
Cliff Barrows (born 1923), music and program director for the Billy Graham Evangelistic Association
Cliff Burton (1962–1986), former bassist of the band Metallica
Cliff Martinez (born 1954), American film score composer
Cliff Richard (born 1940), British singer
Clifford T. Ward, British singer/songwriter
Cliff Williams (born 1949),  bassist of the rock band AC/DC

In sports
Cliff Anderson (1944–2021), American basketball player
Cliff Anderson (American football) (1929–1979), American football player
Cliff Avril (born 1986), American football player
Cliff Baldwin (1899–1979), American football player
Cliff Barker (1921-1998), American basketball player
Cliff Bayer (born 1977), American foil fencer
Cliff Branch (1948–2019), American football player
Cliff Fletcher (born 1935), Canadian ice hockey executive and former general manager
Cliff Floyd (born 1972), American baseball player
Cliff Harris (born 1948), American football player
Cliff Thorburn (born 1948), Canadian snooker player
Cliff Lee (born 1978), American baseball pitcher
Cliff Olander (born 1955), American football player
Cliff Morgan (born 1930), Welsh Rugby Union player and later BBC Commentator and broadcaster
Cliff Politte, American baseball player
Cliff Robinson (basketball, born 1960), American basketball player
Clifford Robinson (basketball, born 1966), American basketball player
Cliff Ronning (born 1965), Canadian ice hockey player
Cliff Toney (born 1958), American football player
Cliff Wiley (born 1955), American track and field athlete

Other
Cliff Bleszinski, lead game designer for the company Epic Games
Cliff Michelmore, British television presenter
Cliff Robinson (artist), British comic book artist
Cliff Whiting, New Zealand artist
Cliff Edwards (disambiguation), multiple people

Fictional characters
Cliff Barnes, from the TV drama Dallas
Cliff Booth, a character in Once Upon a Time in Hollywood
Cliff Bradshaw, the male lead in the musical Cabaret
Cliff Carmichael, the second Thinker (DC Comics), a villain
Cliff Clavin, in the Cheers TV series
Cliff Clewless, from the comic strip Brewster Rockit: Space Guy!
Cliff Dagger, an antagonist in the animated show M.A.S.K. (TV series)
 Cliff, the main Psycho killer in Roadflower
Cliff Feltbottom, a character from animated show CatDog
Cliff Huxtable, the main protagonist of the TV series The Cosby Show
Cliff Steele, a DC Comics superhero known as Robotman

See also
Cliff (surname)

References

English masculine given names
Hypocorisms